Heliothis phloxiphaga is a species of moth of the family Noctuidae. It is found in the United States and southern Canada.

Adults are on wing during summer.

The larvae feed on the flowers and seeds of a wide variety of plants.

External links
A Review Of The Phloxiphaga Group Of Thegenus Heliothis (Noctuidae: Heliothentinae*)With Description Of A New Species

Heliothis
Moths of North America
Moths described in 1867